Pinacoteca Diego Rivera is an art gallery in downtown Xalapa, in Veracruz state, of eastern Mexico. It has a large collection of the works of Diego Rivera.

The museum was inaugurated by the state government on April 21, 1998, to provide the opportunity to the public to study the artwork of one of Mexico's famous painters.

See also
 List of single-artist museums
 Museo Mural Diego Rivera, Mexico City

References

External links
Portal Veracruz 

Art museums and galleries in Mexico
Biographical museums in Mexico
Modern art museums
Xalapa
Art museums established in 1998
1998 establishments in Mexico
Museums in Veracruz
Rivera